The Radiomycetaceae are a family of fungi in the order Mucorales. Members of this family have a widespread distribution, but are more commonly found in warm climates.

Description
Species in this family have sporangiola borne on complex ampullae, simple or branched, often stoloniferous sporangiophores, sporangia absent. Their zygospores are smooth, and borne on apposed, appendaged suspensors.

References

External links
 
 Index Fungorum

Zygomycota